George Marius Kennedy (July 1841 – 6 March 1869) was an English first-class cricketer and British Army officer.

The son of John Pitt Kennedy, he was born in July 1841 and was educated at Cheltenham College. Kennedy played first-class cricket for the Gentlemen of the North against the Gentlemen of the South on two occasions in 1861 and 1862. In the 1861 fixture, he took a five wicket haul in the Gentlemen of the South's first-innings, taking figures of 5 for 70. After leaving Cheltenham, he attended the Royal Military Academy, Woolwich. He graduated from Woolwich into the Royal Artillery as a lieutenant in 1864. While serving in British India, Kennedy was part of a tiger hunting expedition near Secunderabad when he became ill from heat stroke, dying on 6 March 1869.

References

External links

1841 births
1869 deaths
English people of Irish descent
People educated at Cheltenham College
English cricketers
Gentlemen of the North cricketers
Graduates of the Royal Military Academy, Woolwich
Royal Artillery officers
Deaths from hyperthermia